Itchan Kala is the walled inner town of the city of Khiva, Uzbekistan. Since 1990, it has been protected as a World Heritage Site.

The old town retains more than 50 historic monuments and 250 old houses, dating primarily from the eighteenth or nineteenth centuries. Juma Mosque, for instance, was established in the tenth century and rebuilt from 1788 to 1789, although its celebrated hypostyle hall still retains 112 columns taken from ancient structures.

The most spectacular features of Itchan Kala are its crenellated brick walls and four gates, one at each side of the rectangular fortress. Although the foundations are believed to have been laid in the tenth century, present-day  walls were erected mostly in the late seventeenth century and later repaired.

Notable buildings in Itchan Kala are Juma Mosque, Ak Mosque, madrasahs of Alla-Kulli-Khan, Muhammad Aminkhon, Muhammad Rakhimkhon, Mausoleums of Pahlavon Mahmoud, Sayid Allavuddin, Shergozikhon as well as caravanserais and markets.

Gallery

References

External links 

Ichan Kala - UNESCO World Heritage Centre

Archaeological sites in Uzbekistan
World Heritage Sites in Uzbekistan
Khiva